Cao Jie (died 2 July 260), formally known as Empress Xianmu, was the last empress of the Eastern Han dynasty of China. She was the second wife of Emperor Xian, the last Han emperor, and became known as the Duchess of Shanyang after her husband's abdication. She was a half-sister of Cao Pi, who ended the Han dynasty by forcing Emperor Xian to abdicate the throne in his favour and established the state of Cao Wei. She fiercely opposed the coup d'état orchestrated by Cao Pi, repeatedly refusing to hand over the imperial seal.

Empress Xianmu is praised in the traditional point of view as the last defender of the failed Han Dynasty, alongside Empress Fu Shou and Lady Dong in contrast to Emperor Xian's negligence.

Family background and marriage to Emperor Xian
Cao Jie was a daughter of the warlord Cao Cao, who by 196 had Emperor Xian under his control and issuing edicts in Emperor Xian's name to his own benefit in his campaign to reunite the empire, which had been held by regional warlords. In 213, Cao, who by that point had been created the Duke of Wei (later King of Wei), offered three daughters to be Emperor Xian's consorts – Cao Jie and her elder sister, Cao Xian, and younger sister, Cao Hua. Initially, their titles were Furen (夫人); in 214, their titles were upgraded to Guiren (貴人).

In late 214, Emperor Xian's first wife Empress Fu Shou was discovered to have advocated a conspiracy against Cao Cao in 200. Although 14 years had elapsed, Cao Cao was still so angry at her that he forcibly had her deposed and executed on 8 January 215. In 6 March 215, Cao Jie was named Empress to replace her.

As empress
Not much is known about Empress Cao's life as empress, but it was clear that by that point her husband was thoroughly powerless, as her father held all power.

Although Empress Cao was under pressure from her father so that she could enjoy such a noble position to favor the Cao clan, she seemed to be quite loyal to the Han family; in fact, demonstrating this loyalty by being the last stand when her half-brother, Cao Pi, brought an end to the Han dynasty.

In March 220, her father died, and her brother Cao Pi succeeded him as the King of Wei. Later that year, he forced Emperor Xian to abdicate in favour of him, ending the Han dynasty.

It is said by traditional historians that Empress Cao disagreed of Cao Pi's plan of deposing the Han dynasty to take the throne for himself. As Cao Pi sent messengers to demand Empress Cao surrender her empress's seal, she refused several times. Finally under increasing pressure, empress Cao relented, but she angrily threw the seal to the ground and said: "The Heaven will not give you people any blessing !"

As Duchess of Shanyang
After abdication, the former Emperor Xian was demoted to the Duke of Shanyang. Hence, the former empress Cao was given the title the Duchess of Shanyang.

It was said that when arriving at Shanyang and witness the poverty and misfortune of the war-torn region, the newly appointed Duke and Duchess decided to use their resources and wealth - including the medicine knowledge learnt in the imperial palace - to support and to cure the local people. They also wore only humble and coarse clothes when paying visits to the inhabitants. Thanks to the couple's efforts, Shanyang region finally became prosperous, and the local population paid luxurious tributes to the Duke and Duchess as a token of gratitude. Later, the Duke and Duchess of Shanyang was named as "Medicine family of Dragon and Phoenix". Today, there is still a painting of "Emperor Xian practicing medicine to save the people".

Her husband died in April 234. She died 26 years later and was buried with him with honours befitting an empress, using Han ceremonies.

In the novel Romance of the Three Kingdoms
Cao Jie in the historical novel Romance of the Three Kingdoms was depicted quite close to her historical records. After the death of Empress Fu, Cao Jie was named Empress to replace her.

In Chapter 80, Empress Cao was angered when knowing that Cao Pi's subordinates demanded Emperor Xian to abdicate in favour of Cao Pi. Later as the armed Cao Hong and Cao Xiu rushed to the palace searching for Emperor Xian, an enraged Empress Cao shouted: "You dishonesty rebels ! My father [Cao Cao] overshadowed the whole land, yet he never dared to aspire the sacred throne. But my brother who had just only succeeded him, set no bound to his ambition and would usurp the Throne. The Heaven will not give him any blessing !"

Mao Zonggang in his comment praised the loyalty of the character empress Cao, considered her as a heroine similar to Empress Fu and Consort Dong.

See also
 Cao Wei family trees#Cao Cao's other wives and children
 Lists of people of the Three Kingdoms

Notes

References

 Chen, Shou (3rd century). Records of the Three Kingdoms (Sanguozhi).
 Fan, Ye (5th century). Book of the Later Han (Houhanshu).
 Sima, Guang (1084). Zizhi Tongjian.

|-

Han dynasty empresses
Imperials during the end of the Han dynasty
Family of Cao Cao
Year of birth unknown
260 deaths
3rd-century Chinese women
3rd-century Chinese people